Y2K: The Album is the debut album by American hip hop group Screwball. It was released on February 8, 2000 via Tommy Boy Records. Recording sessions took place at C Mo' Greens Studio, D&D Studios and House Of Hits in New York City. Production was handled by several record producers, including Mike Heron, Godfather Don, DJ Premier, Pete Rock, Marley Marl and Biz Markie. It features guest appearances from Big Noyd, Capone, Cormega, MC Shan, Mobb Deep, Nature, Nashawn, Prince A.D. and Triple Seis. The album peaked at number 50 on the US Billboard Top R&B/Hip-Hop Albums. Its singles "F.A.Y.B.A.N." and "H-O-S-T-Y-L-E" were also charted on the Hot Rap Songs.

Track listing

Sample credits
Track 2 contains a sample of "Take the Night Off" written by Nona Hendryx and performed by Labelle
Track 4 contains a sample of "There's a Train Leavin'" written by Quincy Jones and Charles May and performed by Quincy Jones
Track 6 contains a sample of "Firewater" written by Joseph Cartagena, Corey Woods and Rodney Lemay and performed by Fat Joe
Track 8 contains a scratch of "The Bridge" written by Marlon Williams and Shawn Moltke and performed by Marley Marl
Track 9 contains a sample of "Keeps Getting Better" written by Harvey Scales and Melvin Griffin and performed by Harvey Scales
Track 12 contains a sample of "Mountain High Valley Low" written by Raymond Scott and Bernie Hanighen and performed by Morgana King

Charts

References

External links

1999 debut albums
Screwball (group) albums
Tommy Boy Records albums
Albums produced by Pete Rock
Albums produced by DJ Premier
Albums produced by Marley Marl
Albums produced by Godfather Don